J.N. Burnett Secondary School is a secondary school located at 5011 Granville Ave., Richmond, British Columbia, Canada. The current principal is Michael Jaswal, and there are currently over 1000 students enrolled.

The school is named after John Napier Burnett, a pioneer. 

Burnett's badminton program, having placed 2nd at the 2001-02 British Columbia badminton provincials, Champions in 2002–03, 2nd in 2007–08, and 2nd in 2009–10.

Burnett's tennis program placed in the Top 2 of Richmond High Schools consistently since 2000. Between 2003 and 2006, Burnett was 1st in RSSAA and consistently placed in the Top 6 and the BCSSA. As of May 2018, Burnett holds the top ranking in the Richmond school district. 

Burnett's table tennis program won the provincial championship in 2007 and 2008.

The SAT School Code for Burnett is 821309.

History
Burnett opened in 1968 with grades 8–10, being classified as a junior secondary school. The first year the school was open (1968–1969), the building's second floor had not yet been completed, which caused the class times for different grades to vary for a year; students in the 9th and 10th grade attended classes morning, whereas 8th grade classes took place in the afternoon. In September 1969, the entire student body was once again attending with normal hours.

Alumni

Matt Dennison co-creator of IFHT

Benjamin Lam global chairman of Cover Corp

References

External links
 , Official web site

School Reports — Ministry of Education
 Class Size
 Satisfaction Survey
 School Performance
 Skills Assessment
 Enrollment Reports

High schools in Richmond, British Columbia
Educational institutions established in 1968
1968 establishments in British Columbia